Shin Hyun Joon (born April 9, 1983 in South Korea) is a South Korean footballer who currently plays for Putrajaya SPA F.C.

Club career 
He started his senior career in Gangneung City

References

External links 
 Shin Hyun Joon on deltras-fc.com
 Profile at Liga Indonesia Official Site

1983 births
South Korean footballers
South Korean expatriate footballers
Living people
Gangneung City FC players
PSPS Pekanbaru players
PSMS Medan players
Korea National League players
Liga 1 (Indonesia) players
Expatriate footballers in Indonesia
South Korean expatriate sportspeople in Indonesia
Expatriate footballers in Malaysia
Association football midfielders